The Klaxon.com was an online news organization that offered commentary and analysis on emergencies and disasters around the world. It was unique not only for its content, but also because it was operated completely on handheld devices, such as the iPhone and BlackBerry, by staff anywhere in the world. It was co-founded in 2009 by Joshua Wilwohl and Chuck Frank.

References

American news websites
Internet properties established in 2009